Al-Ma'mun al-Bata'ihi was an Egyptian vizier of the Fatimid Caliphate for four years during the caliphate of al-Amir bi-Ahkami l-Lah. During his term, he reopened the house of knowledge, made efforts to restore shi'ite orthodoxy, and tried to reconcile the differences between the Fatimids and the Nizaris. His term ended with his execution, which was ordered by the caliph.

Biography

His name was Qaʾid Abū Muḥammad ʿAlī bin Fatik but is better known by the name 'al-Ma'mun'.  Little is known of his life before he succeeded Al-Afdal Shahanshah, murdered by Assassins, as the Fatimid vizier in 1121 ACE.

On coming to power, he reopened the Dar al-Hikmah (House of Wisdom) in Cairo, closed in 1119 by his predecessor. He also raised the salaries of state officials. It was during his term that the Al-Aqmar mosque was built. Construction was completed by 1125 ACE. He also built three pavilions(المناظر) in the eastern Grand Palace in Cairo.

He made a proclamation that every inhabitant of Cairo or Fustat who owned a house in ruins should repair it to live in, sell or rent. In case of non-compliance with the order, the house would be confiscated.

Restoration of Shi'ite orthodoxy
He restored the celebrations of Mawlid of Prophet Muhammad, Ali, Fatima and of the current Imam, al-Amir. He ordered the financing of mawlids and wuqūdāt(four nights of lights and celebrations) as customary, consisting of money and a gift of sweets such as honey or nuts, and fragrances such as rose water, musk or camphor. This recovery marked a return to the Shi'ite orthodoxy, weakened during the previous reigns.

Measures against the Nizari
Acting against the possible influence of the Nizari Isma'ilis in Egypt, in 1122 he organised a large public meeting to establish the legitimacy of the descendants of al-Musta'li and reject the successors of Nizar ibn al-Mustansir. Many senior Fatimid officials attended, including Abu Muhammad bin Adam, the head of the Dar al-Hikmah. On this occasion, the sister of Nizar, hidden behind a curtain, swore that when al-Mustansir was on his deathbed, he designated al-Mustaʿli as his successor. At the end of the meeting, al-Ma'mun ordered Ibn al-Sayrafi (Abu-l-Qasim Ali Ibn al-Sayrafi, d. 1147), the secretary of the Fatimid Chancery, to write a letter (sijill), known under the title of 'al-Hidayat al-Amiriyya li-Mawlana al-Amir fi ithbat Imamat Mawlana al-Mustaʿli waʿr-radd alaʿn Nizariyya' or 'ar Risalatuʿl-Amiriyya' in favor of al-Mustaʿli, which was to be read from the minbar of all the mosques in Egypt.  He also circulated copies of this letter in Syria, causing an outcry among the Nizaris of Damascus.

Death
The uncertain financial situation of the empire and its reflections on the complex political and religious context of the country and, most of all, the provoked hostility of the Imam finally led to his arrest and execution in 1125.

References

Sources
 

1125 deaths
Viziers of the Fatimid Caliphate
Year of birth unknown
12th-century Egyptian people
History of Cairo
People executed by the Fatimid Caliphate